The Caretaker Government of Bangladesh was a form of government in which Bangladesh used to be ruled by a selected government for an interim period during the transition from one elected government to another, after the completion of tenure of the former, during the period between 1996 and 2008. The outgoing elected government used to hand over its power to the nonelected nonpartisan caretaker government (CTG).

Top members of the caretaker government did not represent any political party; nor were they allowed to contest the elections. The main objective of the caretaker government was to create a level playing field environment in which an election could be held in a free and fair manner without any political influence by the outgoing government.

It was not empowered to take any policy decisions unless it was necessary. The head of the caretaker government was called the Chief Adviser (in place of Prime Minister of Bangladesh) and was selected by the President of Bangladesh. The Chief Adviser selected the other advisers. The top positions of the administration were generally distributed among the advisers. The Chief Adviser and the other advisers were committed for their activities to the President of Bangladesh.

History
In 1990 three party alliances discussed creating a better environment for elections. They jointly made a demand for it. After the forced resignation of General Hussain Muhammad Ershad, the three alliances nominated Chief Justice Shahabuddin Ahmed as the Chief Adviser. The caretaker government was headed by a Chief Adviser, who enjoyed the same power as the regular prime minister of the country except in defence matters. The advisers functioned as ministers.

Since 1996, a Caretaker government has managed the elections and transitions of 1996, 2001 and 2008. Although the first caretaker government (CTG) was intended to help the transition from authoritarianism to democracy, this system was adopted as part of the Constitution in 1996 by the Sixth Parliament. It was dominated by Bangladesh Nationalist Party, which yielded to opposition pressure.

In Bangladesh, a Caretaker Government (CTG) ruled for the period of 1990 to 1991 with the understanding of the major political party alliances. Later, CTGs were formed within the constitutional framework in 1996, 2001 and 2006. The 13th amendment to the constitution was passed in the parliament formalising this arrangement.

In addition, an extra-constitutional military-backed CTG was installed in 2007; it governed the country without legitimacy, but ultimately handed over power to the elected political party following 29 December 2008 parliamentary election. They were under pressure internationally to yield to a democratically elected government.

According to the provision (before abolishment) of CTG in the Bangladesh Constitution, there were six options to appoint a Chief Advisor (CA). The last option of CA is the President. The CTG had to hold an election within 90 days and in 120 days could hand over power to the duly elected political party. The daily operations of government, routine duties, and holding parliamentary election are the mandated responsibilities of the CTG.

Caretaker Government was very popular in Bangladesh although it was a contradiction with constitution. Recently Pakistan and Greece have also adopted this model to hold elections and overcome political stalemate.

2008 Election

The national election of Bangladesh was held on 29 December 2008 under the Caretaker government formed with Dr. Fakhruddin Ahmed as the Chief Adviser on 13 January 2007. This was the third Caretaker government formed after the tenure of the government of prime minister Khaleda Zia ended in October 2006. The Caretaker government of Dr. Fakhruddin Ahmed functioned without legislative authority as it continued to function after its scheduled tenure of 120 days ended on 12 May 2007. All decisions taken after this date must be ratified by the parliament for the sake of legitimacy.

The Caretaker government of Dr. Fakhruddin Ahmed was a military controlled and has made extensive use of the military to stymie the chaos that preceded 11 January 2007 (popularly known as 1/11, like 9/11). From the very outset however, the government made it clear that they were there not only to arrange a free and fair election, but also to make sure that all aspects that are connected to it are reviewed properly. This meant major reforms in the election system, but also making sure that corrupt candidates could not take part in the election.

The task was however an enormous one, since Bangladesh is regarded as one of the most corrupt nations in the world. Therefore, the government had exceeded its mandated term, which according to the constitution allows it to stay only for 90 days.

Reforms
The caretaker government introduced Voter ID cards (with photograph) for the first time just before 2008 Bangladeshi general election. The Bangladesh Army, including members of other military forces, were deployed throughout the nation prior to the elections, including the remotest areas, to assist with voter registration and issuance of the new IDs. They were equipped with laptops and small digital cameras in an effort that would result in the most orderly voters' registration list in Bangladesh's history.

Reactions
Initial reactions of the public were welcoming. The arrests of corrupt prominent politicians in 2007 led many to believe that a new political age was imminent. No new major parties came into the scene. In some cases, former political leaders had been released from prison in 2008 and appeared to be returning to former positions and displacing reformers.

Opponents of the CTG's long tenure had chiefly been of the two major political parties. Members of the public in general understood the reasons and necessity for the government' actions.

The televisions and print media had reported events throughout the term (2007 to 2008). There had been little questioning of the leaders who had been charged with an array of corruption charges, and who were now on the verge of returning to power. Almost all of the television channels are now owned by members from one of the two major parties.

Chief Advisers since 1991
 Shahabuddin Ahmed – Election of 1991
 Muhammad Habibur Rahman – Election of 1996
 Latifur Rahman – Election of 2001
 Iajuddin Ahmed – Had to resign by a military coup on 11 January 2007
 Fakhruddin Ahmed – Appointed on 12 January 2007 by an army group followed by a coup – Election of 2008

Abolishment of CTG
In 2011 the Bangladesh Awami League led government abolished the caretaker government through passage of the 15th amendment of the constitution with its majority in Parliament.

Opposition parties, including the BNP, have protested passage of the amendment. People are worried about next elections since the CTG was abolished. Sheikh Hasina has assured the public that parliament will be dissolved if the Court so decides.

See also
 Chief Justice of Bangladesh

References

External links
 
 
 

Politics of Bangladesh
Government of Bangladesh
Caretaker governments